The Rencontres cinématographies et numériques de Cotonou (ReCiCo) is a Beninese film festival established in 2019.

The first edition of ReCiCo was held in September 2019. The jury for the 2019 special jury prize consisted of Jacques Béhanzin, Florisse Adjanohoun, Akambi Akala and Djaz.

2019 awards

References

Film festivals in Africa
Film festivals established in 2018
Cinema of Benin
Festivals in Benin